Vissanu Sophanich (born July 4, 1974) is a track and field sprint athlete who competed internationally for Thailand.
He was on the Thai team in the Men's 4 x 100 metre relay at the 2000 Summer Olympics.

His best time is 10.38 seconds (2000 Asian Athletics Championships, Jakarta, 2000). He holds the national 4-man relay record of 38.80 seconds, also in Jakarta on August 31, 2000, a performance which won the gold medal at the 2000 Asian Athletics Championships (relay team members: Kongdech Natenee, Vissanu Sophanich, Ekkachai Janthana, Sittichai Suwonprateep).

See also 
2001 World Championships in Athletics – Men's 4 x 100 metres relay.
Thai records in athletics

References

1974 births
Living people
Vissanu Sophanich
Vissanu Sophanich
Athletes (track and field) at the 2000 Summer Olympics
Asian Games medalists in athletics (track and field)
Athletes (track and field) at the 1998 Asian Games
Athletes (track and field) at the 2002 Asian Games
Vissanu Sophanich
Vissanu Sophanich
Southeast Asian Games medalists in athletics
Vissanu Sophanich
Medalists at the 1998 Asian Games
Medalists at the 2002 Asian Games
Competitors at the 2001 Southeast Asian Games
Vissanu Sophanich
Vissanu Sophanich